Arkady Arkadyevich Vyatchanin (born 4 April 1984) is a retired Russian, Serbian and American backstroke swimmer. He was born in Vorkuta, and in 1999 moved to Taganrog, Russia, where he graduated from the South Federal University. He was a member of the Russian National Team in 2000–2015; moved to Serbia in 2015 and to the United States in 2017, and retired in June 2018.

Family
Vyatchanin came from a swimming family and was initially trained by his aunt, father and mother, who were all retired competitive swimmers and professional swimming coaches. His father Arkady Sr. (1946–2014) held nine Soviet swimming titles and was a member of the Soviet team from 1965 to 1971. His mother Irina and elder sister Alla competed at the national level. Vyatchanin is married to Evgeniya.

Change of nationality 
In 2013 Vyatchanin announced an intention to leave the Russian team and compete for another country saying he gave all he could to team Russia. In 2015 he obtained Serbian citizenship (name in ), but could not complete internationally because of administrative errors in his international transfer. Hence he missed the 2016 Summer Olympics. In 2017 Vyatchanin obtained American citizenship. He retired in June 2018 aiming to become a swimming coach.

See also
 World record progression 100 metres backstroke
 World record progression 200 metres backstroke

References

External links

 

1984 births
Living people
People from Vorkuta
Russian male backstroke swimmers
Serbian male backstroke swimmers
American male backstroke swimmers
Swimmers at the 2004 Summer Olympics
Swimmers at the 2008 Summer Olympics
Swimmers at the 2012 Summer Olympics
Olympic swimmers of Russia
Olympic bronze medalists for Russia
World record setters in swimming
Olympic bronze medalists in swimming
World Aquatics Championships medalists in swimming
Medalists at the FINA World Swimming Championships (25 m)
European Aquatics Championships medalists in swimming
Medalists at the 2008 Summer Olympics
Serbian people of Russian descent
American people of Russian descent
Sportspeople from the Komi Republic